The Coffin Club, formerly Lovecraft Bar, is a horror-themed, LGBT-friendly bar in Portland, Oregon.

Description and history 
Lovecraft Bar, named after H. P. Lovecraft, opened on January 1, 2011. The horror-themed bar often hosts LGBT events and has been described as the city's "best known goth nightclub". In 2017, Food & Wine said the bar is "decorated as such with skulls, tentacles, a coffin, and, of course, images of pulp horror master, H.P. Lovecraft. Expect burlesque shows, tarot readings, horror movie nights, lots of goth and new wave music and plenty of fog."

The business announced an expansion in 2016. In 2018, Shannon Gormley of Willamette Week wrote, 

In 2019, the newspaper said, "Modeled after the imagery of the famously problematic early 20th century horror writer, the Lovecraft is a testament to old-school Portland subcultures and gothy nostalgia. Decked out in horror iconography and glowing pentagrams, the club hosts nightly dance parties and live music, as well as the occasional burlesque show. Even for normcores, it's one of the most fun dance halls in town." Thrillist's Pete Cottell wrote, "The Lovecraft is about as on-the-nose as it gets when it comes to goth aesthetics. It’s a shadowy, smoky fantasyland for diehards and scenesters alike, and the majority of their events revolve around the tangled web of microgenres that all find common roots in post-punk and new wave. We can’t predict what the next big thing will be when the coldwave revival goes bust, but you can count on the Lovecraft to devote an entire night to it that will be at capacity by midnight no matter what."

Reception
The Oregonian included Lovecraft in a 2012 list of "six bars that just might be the oddest nightspots around Portland".

See also

 LGBT culture in Portland, Oregon

References

External links

 

2011 establishments in Oregon
Buckman, Portland, Oregon
Drinking establishments in Oregon
LGBT culture in Portland, Oregon
Restaurants in Portland, Oregon